Grace DeMoss Zwahlen (born 1927) is a former competitive women's American amateur golfer from Oregon.

She was the first Pacific Northwesterner to be named to the United States Curtis Cup team in 1952 and then again in 1954. After retiring from competitive golf, Zwahlen was elected to numerous sports Halls of Fame. From 1986 to 2017 she gave back to the game of golf by serving as a girls' golf coach at high schools in Oregon and Southern California.

Early life and career
DeMoss was born in Corvallis, Oregon, one of five daughters of Ray DeMoss, a Corvallis businessman. She started playing golf as a teenager at the Corvallis Country Club, though she was initially more interested in equestrian sports.

She entered her first tournament, the Portland Open, in 1945 and came in last place. In her next major tournament a year later, the Pacific Northwest Golf Association Amateur, she made the semifinals, and then a year after that, lost in the finals. Her first tournament victory came in the 1947 Portland City Amateur.

Golf success
After her win in Portland, she entered tournaments across North America, primarily on the west coast. In 1949, she won her first major tournament, the Canadian Women's Amateur. Following that win, she played throughout the winter in California to keep her game sharp. In 1950, she won the Pacific Northwest Amateur Championship played at Capilano Golf and Country Club in West Vancouver, British Columbia. She followed this victory with a semifinalist finish at the U.S. Women's Amateur, and was a finalist at the Canadian Women's Amateur, the Women's Trans-Mississippi, and the Oregon Women's Amateur, and was medalist at the Women's Western Open.

In 1952, she was named to the United States' Curtis Cup team, the first golfer from the Northwest to receive the honor. However, that year, the American team lost the Cup for the first time since its inception. Two years later, in 1954, DeMoss was again named to the team. This time, DeMoss and her team reclaimed the Cup at the matches contested at Merion Golf Club.

Following her early success, she relocated to Florida to play golf year round where she won Florida Women's Amateur championships in 1955, 1957, and 1958. She returned to the Northwest to claim three straight Oregon women's amateur titles from 1956 to 1958.

She continued to play competitively into the 1960s before retiring to start and raise her family. From 1986–2006, she was the girls' golf coach at Crescent Valley High School in her hometown of Corvallis, Oregon and from 2007–2017 she was the girls' freshman/sophomore golf coach at Santa Margarita Catholic High School in Rancho Santa Margarita, California.

Personal
DeMoss graduated from Oregon State University in 1952, but did not compete collegiately as Oregon State did not have a women's golf team until the 1970s. Following her graduation, DeMoss married Howard K. Smith and golfed as "Mrs. Grace DeMoss Smith" or "Mrs. Howard Smith" for several years. She was later married to Fred C. Zwahlen Jr., who was the founder and chairman of the Department of Journalism at Oregon State, from the late 1950s until his death in 2004.

DeMoss's family is linked to several other Oregon sports legends. Her sister Maxine married Oregon State football and basketball player Don Durdan, and another sister, Rae Ardis, married Durdan's teammate Quentin Greenough. Durdan, was the MVP of the 1942 Rose Bowl game and, in 1998, was inducted into the Rose Bowl Hall of Fame. After serving in the United States Navy during World War II, Durdan went on to play professional football for the San Francisco 49ers.

Her brother-in-law, Ernie Zwahlen, played football at Oregon State and was the starting defensive tackle on Oregon State's 1957 Rose Bowl team and 1962 Liberty Bowl team. He went on to become an offensive line coach for the New York Jets, San Francisco 49ers, Houston Oilers and Baltimore Colts. Later he was a minority owner of the Houston Aeros professional hockey team.

DeMoss's nephew, Dave Roberts, was the first overall player selected in the 1972 Major League Baseball draft, by the San Diego Padres. Roberts had a 10-year MLB career playing for the San Diego Padres, Texas Rangers, Houston Astros and Philadelphia Phillies.

DeMoss resides in Coto de Caza, California and has two children, daughter Molly Katherine Zwahlen Walsh (husband Mark Walsh) also of Coto de Caza and son Skip DeMoss Zwahlen of Venice, California.

Honors
She was named to the Oregon Sports Hall of Fame in 1986, the Oregon State University Sports Hall of Fame in 1991, and the Pacific Northwest Golf Association Hall of Fame in 1993. and the Corvallis High School Hall of Fame in 2016.

Tournament wins
1949 Arizona Women's Amateur, Pebble Beach Women's Golf Championship, Howell Team Trophy, Trans-Mississippi Golf Tournament (with Edean Anderson Ihlanfeldt), Canadian Women's Amateur
1950 Pacific Northwest Women's Amateur, Oregon Women's Amateur, Pebble Beach Women's Golf Championship, Monterey 54-hole stroke play
1950 Fresno Open
1951 Oregon Women's Amateur, Trans-Mississippi, Howell Team Trophy, Trans-Mississippi Golf Tournament (with Edean Ihlanfeldt)
1952 Howell Team Trophy, Trans-Mississippi Golf Tournament (with Edean Anderson Ihlanfeldt)
1954 Doherty Women's Amateur Championship
1955 Florida Women's Amateur
1956 Oregon Women's Amateur
1957 Oregon Women's Amateur, Florida Women's Amateur
1958 Oregon Women's Amateur, Florida Women's Amateur

Notable runner-up finishes
1946 Oregon Women's Amateur
1947 Pacific Northwest Women's Amateur
1950 Oregon Women's Amateur, Canadian Women's Amateur, Women's Trans-Mississippi Amateur
1951 Pacific Northwest Women's Amateur
1953 Pacific Northwest Women's Amateur

Team appearances
Amateur
Curtis Cup (representing the United States): 1952, 1954 (winners)

References

American female golfers
Amateur golfers
Golfers from Oregon
Oregon State University alumni
Sportspeople from Corvallis, Oregon
Corvallis High School (Oregon) alumni
1927 births
Living people
21st-century American women